Jenifer Widjaja (born 7 December 1986) is a former professional tennis player from Brazil.

Biography
Widjaja, a right-handed player, is originally from São Roque near the city of São Paulo and is of Indonesian descent.

Coached by her father Tony, she was only 14 when she began competing in local ITF circuit tournaments. In 2004, she had her breakthrough year when she won three $10,000 events in the space of a month, at Guayaquil, La Paz and Asuncion. Her biggest tournament win was a $25,000 tournament in San Luis Potosi in 2006.

She featured in a WTA Tour main draw for the first time at the 2007 Copa Colsanitas (Bogota), in the women's doubles with Larissa Carvalho. They were defeated in the first round by Flavia Pennetta and Roberta Vinci. Straight after that event, she travelled to Acapulco and made the main singles draw of the Abierto Mexicano Telcel WTA tournament, as a lucky loser from qualifying, where she was beaten again in the opening round, by sixth seed Gisela Dulko. She played in the singles qualifying draws for the 2007 French Open, Wimbledon Championships and US Open Grand Slam events, as well as competing for Brazil at the Pan American Games in Rio de Janeiro.

Despite ending 2007 at a career best of No. 186 in the world, she decided to retire from professional tennis. Over the next few years she instead attended college in the United States and played collegiate tennis for the Pacific Tigers in Stockton, California.

She represented Brazil in a total of ten Fed Cup ties for a 6/4 overall record, with all six wins coming in singles.

ITF finals

Singles (5–5)

Doubles (2–6)

References

External links
 
 
 

1986 births
Living people
Brazilian female tennis players
Tennis players from São Paulo
Pacific Tigers women's tennis players
Pan American Games competitors for Brazil
Tennis players at the 2007 Pan American Games
Brazilian people of Indonesian descent
Sportspeople of Indonesian descent
College women's tennis players in the United States
South American Games medalists in tennis
South American Games silver medalists for Brazil
Competitors at the 2002 South American Games
20th-century Brazilian women
21st-century Brazilian women
People from São Roque, São Paulo